Cheilopogon pinnatibarbatus japonicus is a subspecies of flyingfish of the family Exocoetidae, found in the seas around Japan. Its length is up to 50 cm.

References
 

pinnatibarbatus japonicus